Michael Robert Ockrent (18 June 1946 – 2 December 1999) was a British stage director, well-known both for his Broadway musicals and smaller niche plays. He was educated at Highgate School. Through directing Educating Rita, The Nerd and Follies, he became an established figure in London theatre. In 1986 he made a successful transition to New York City with Me and My Girl that earned several Tony Award nominations. In later life Ockrent worked in film, mainly straight-to-TV movies.

In 1992 Ockrent worked with Susan Stroman on Crazy for You and other productions. They were married in 1996 and remained so until Ockrent's death from leukaemia in New York in 1999. Ockrent's son is the screenwriter and director Ben Ockrent.

A charitable trust now exists in his name. The trust aims to give access to theatre for children with cancer, involving nights at the theatre with visits backstage afterwards. It also funds leukaemia research, "both mainstream and 'alternative'".

Work

Filmography 
Shakespeare Lives! (1982) TV series (co-producer)
Bestseller (1985) (TV) (director)
Mrs. Capper's Birthday (1985) (TV) (a.k.a. Star Quality: Mrs. Capper's Birthday (UK)) (director)
Dancin' Thru the Dark (1990) (director)
Money for Nothing (1993/II) (TV) (a.k.a. Hot Millions (USA) or Screen One: Money for Nothing (UK: series title)) (director)
A Christmas Carol (2004/I) (TV) (musical) (a.k.a. A Christmas Carol: The Musical (USA)) (screenplay)

Stage 
The Dead of Night by Stanley Eveling (1975)
Once a Catholic (1979)
The Nerd, Aldwych Theatre, London (1984) (starring Rowan Atkinson)
Rowan Atkinson at the Atkinson (1986)
Me and My Girl (1986–1989)
Happy Birthday, Sir Larry (31 May 1987) an 80th birthday tribute to Lord Olivier
Crazy for You (1991–1996) (Ockrent conceived the idea)
A Christmas Carol (1995)
Big (1996)
King David (1997)

Novel 

Running Down Broadway (1992)

Awards and nominations 
Awards
1987 – Drama Desk Award Outstanding Book – Me and My Girl
1987 – Drama Desk Award Outstanding Director of a Musical – Me and My Girl
Nominations
1987 – Tony Award Best Book of a Musical – Me and My Girl (joint with L. Arthur Rose, Douglas Furber and Stephen Fry)
1987 – Tony Award Best Direction of a Musical – Me and My Girl
1992 – Drama Desk Award Best Direction of a Musical – Crazy for You
1992 – Drama Desk Award Outstanding Director of a Musical – Crazy for You

References

External links 
The Mike Ockrent charitable trust

1946 births
1999 deaths
People educated at Highgate School
Drama Desk Award winners
Tony Award winners
British costume designers